Jos McGlone, also known by the nickname of "Josh ", was a professional rugby league footballer who played in the 1920s. He played at club level for the Featherstone Rovers (Heritage № 52).

Playing career
Jos McGlone made his début for the Featherstone Rovers on Tuesday 15 January 1924.

References

External links

Search for "McGlone" at rugbyleagueproject.org

Featherstone Rovers players
Place of birth missing
Place of death missing
English rugby league players
Year of birth missing
Year of death missing